Conrad Alcon Jantjes (born 24 March 1980 in Boksburg, Gauteng) is a South African rugby union footballer who used to play primarily as a fullback for the Springboks in international rugby and the Stormers in Super Rugby. In the domestic Currie Cup he spent six seasons with the Golden Lions before switching to his current team, Western Province.

Former Springbok coach Harry Viljoen handed Jantjes his debut against Italy in 2001, but he fell out of favour before forcing his way back into contention during Jake White's reign as the team's coach.

He failed to win a place in the 2007 Rugby World Cup but found a new lease of life under Peter de Villiers, playing all South Africa's test matches in 2008.

However, despite looking like being South Africa's first choice full back for the 2009 British & Irish Lions series he broke his leg during the 2009 Super 14 season, and was ruled out for over a year until making a return in the 2010 Currie Cup.

Jantjes was born in a close-knit family as the only son and youngest of three children. He grew up with a love for all sports and represented South Africa not only in rugby, but also in both cricket and football at junior level.

References

External links
 
 
 Stormers profile
 

1980 births
Living people
People from Boksburg
South African rugby union players
South Africa international rugby union players
Stormers players
Western Province (rugby union) players
Golden Lions players
Lions (United Rugby Championship) players
Afrikaner people
South African people of Dutch descent
South Africa international rugby sevens players
Rugby sevens players at the 2002 Commonwealth Games
Commonwealth Games bronze medallists for South Africa
Commonwealth Games medallists in rugby sevens
Commonwealth Games rugby sevens players of South Africa
Rugby union players from Gauteng
Rugby union fullbacks
Medallists at the 2002 Commonwealth Games